No Labels is an American political organization. It supports centrist, bi-partisan policies and politics.

The group has been said to have  moderated the Problem Solvers Caucus in the U.S. House of Representatives and to also have created a similar bipartisan working group in the U.S. Senate. The organization also has invested money with the hope of an independent presidential candidate being competitive in the 2024 United States presidential election, some speculating that Larry Hogan, the former Maryland Governor and national leader could be this candidate, after he ruled out running in 2024 as a Republican, but not as an independent.

Critics of the organization have suggested that No Labels exists primarily to advance the financial interests of the wealthy, pointing in particular to the organization offering large "dark money" campaign donations to members of Congress without disclosing the source of the funds.

History and policy proposals 
No Labels was launched in 2010 by former Democratic fundraiser Nancy Jacobson, with the stated goal of developing and supporting bipartisan, centrist solutions to America's problems. Billionaires Michael Bloomberg and Andrew Tisch were among initial prominent supporters. In 2017, the group helped to start the Problem Solvers Caucus in the House of Representatives, a bipartisan group of 58 congresspeople which has backed issues such as funding for infrastructure, criminal justice reform, and gun safety in schools.

Media

No Labels has received both support and criticism for its efforts from both the political right and left, including from writers from Bloomberg News, The Daily Beast, The Washington Post, The New York Times, and The Boston Globe.

Nancy Pelosi as speaker
On November 26, 2018, The Daily Beast reported that "No Labels leadership contemplated a campaign to attack Pelosi aggressively after the primary campaign of centrist Rep. Dan Lipinski," even though Pelosi had supported Lipinski in his primary campaign that year. In the same article, the group countered that "No Labels is not against Nancy Pelosi or any other speaker candidate. We are FOR rules changes that empower members in both parties who want to work across the aisle to find solutions and prevent the fringes–in both parties–from perpetuating endless gridlock." On November 28, 2018, the Problem Solvers Caucus reached an agreement with Leader Pelosi on house rules changes that would foster more bipartisan legislating. In January 2019, the new Democratic majority in the House led by Speaker Nancy Pelosi released a comprehensive reform package that included House rules changes which No Labels had supported through The Speaker Project.

Funding 
As a registered 501(c)(4) organization, No Labels is not required to disclose the identities of its donors.

No Labels' early donors include Andrew Tisch, co-chairman of Loews Corporation; Ron Shaich, founder of Panera Bread; and Dave Morin, a former Facebook executive. Writing in The New York Times, Frank Rich said: "This is exactly the kind of revolving-door synergy between corporate power and governance that turns off Americans left, right and, yes, center. Oblivious to this taint, No Labels named a few fat-cat donors who have ponied up $1 million-plus... What America needs is not another political organization with a toothless agenda and less-than-transparent finances."

No Labels raised approximately $12 million from 2010 to mid-2014. According to a Yahoo! News report based on its internal documents, "much of the group's budget goes toward sustaining or promoting itself". In May 2014, No Labels employed twenty-two paid staffers and eight consultants. Its projected yearly budget for 2014 was $4.5 million, of which 30% was for "digital growth and press", 14% for fundraising, 5% for travel, and 4% for "Congressional relations". Its donors during that period included former Enron executive John Arnold and his wife Laura Arnold; American investor Alfred Taubman, who was convicted in 2002 for antitrust violations, and his wife Judith Rounick; and private equity investor and Republican Party donor John Canning Jr.

According to The Daily Beast, by the end of the 2018 cycle, No Labels' super-PACs received more than $11 million from fifty-three donors, most of whom come from the financial industry.

A Chicago Sun-Times investigation reported that super PACs related to No Labels include: United for Progress, Inc.; Citizens for a Strong America, Inc.; United Together; Govern or Go Home; and Forward, Not Back.

Criticism

Toxic work environment
In December 2022, an article in Politico described a "toxic" culture within No Labels, citing a "cutthroat culture, one where staffers are routinely fired or pushed out, have little trust in management, and believe the workplace environment can be difficult for minority and female colleagues."

Specific criticisms included the hiring of Mark Halperin, a journalist and author accused by multiple women of sexual harassment in 2017, who is No Labels' highest paid employee; a Black employee being singled out to discuss race issues at a staff meeting; and a culture in which "staffers are bombarded with emails and demands by Jacobson."

In response to the criticism, several senior officials for the group described staff complaints as coming from, according to Politico, "aggrieved ex-workers" who could not adapt to a demanding office culture.

See also 
 Centrism
 Political moderate
 Problem Solvers Caucus

References

External links
 
 Hard Right And Hard Left Flock To No Labels, Kate Nocera, BuzzFeed, August 19, 2013

Political movements in the United States
Non-profit organizations based in Washington, D.C.
Organizations established in 2010
501(c)(4) nonprofit organizations
2010 establishments in the United States
United States political action committees